Spilocuscus is a genus of marsupial in the family Phalangeridae. Its members are found on the Cape York Peninsula of Australia, New Guinea, and smaller nearby islands. It contains the following species:

Admiralty Island cuscus, Spilocuscus kraemeri
Common spotted cuscus, Spilocuscus maculatus
Waigeou cuscus, Spilocuscus papuensis
Black-spotted cuscus, Spilocuscus rufoniger
Blue-eyed spotted cuscus, Spilocuscus wilsoni

References

Possums
Marsupial genera
Taxa named by John Edward Gray
Taxonomy articles created by Polbot